Out of the Vein is the third studio album by American rock band Third Eye Blind. Released on May 13, 2003, Out of the Vein is the band's first album with guitarist Tony Fredianelli, who replaced longtime guitarist Kevin Cadogan in 2000. It would also be Third Eye Blind's final album with Elektra Records as well as their final album with bassist Arion Salazar.

Writing and recording 
Out of the Vein was recorded at the group's own Mourning Wood Studios in downtown San Francisco and at Skywalker Sound. Frontman Stephan Jenkins felt that Out of the Vein would mark "a new period for the band", and added that "The first two albums were like two parts of the same piece. We've had a hiatus. This is a new beginning." Jenkins reported having written over 40 songs for the album as of August 2001, just prior to starting the recording process for the album. Out of the Vein was originally scheduled to be released in early 2002, but was delayed several times before its release in May 2003. According to Jenkins, some of the reasons for the delay stemmed from a self-imposed pressure to live up to Third Eye Blind's previous successes, leading him to rewrite lyrics.

The material went over many changes before finally being released. Jenkins originally wanted the album to be titled Crystal Baller, after the song of the same name, but it was renamed to Out of the Vein because the other members hated the name. The single "Blinded" was originally titled "When I See You". A scrapped collaboration with hard rock artist Andrew W.K. was still set to be on the album less than two months before the album's final release date. Their collaboration was titled "Messed Up Kid". Jenkins and Salazar were motived to work with him after having attended a live show of Andrew W.K.'s, and coming away from the experience equal parts baffled and impressed by his style of music. The song featured Andrew W.K. performing backup vocals; Jenkins noted that "his voice is so hilarious because it sounds like it's doubled and compressed, but it's not."

The song "Misfits" initially started as a collaboration between Jenkins and Limp Bizkit frontman Fred Durst. Jenkins spoke about a Third Eye Blind collaboration with Durst in 2000, after Durst invited Jenkins to collaborate on their 2000 album Chocolate Starfish and the Hot Dog Flavored Water, although neither collaboration ever surfaced. Jenkins had visited Durst while he was recording Chocolate Starfish in 2000, and the two had co-written a track together in between Limp Bizkit recording sessions. Jenkins reported the song featured Durst on guitar and Jenkins on vocals, with a "funky" sound atypical of either band's work. Per Jenkins in 2002, this iteration of the song credited Durst with writing the chords, Jenkins with writing the melody and lyrics, and Salazar with writing the bridge; the final version of the song that made the album lacks a Durst performance or writing credit.

As of May 2002, Jenkins reported that they had almost 26 completed songs, and had narrowed it down to 12 songs they felt would make the final tracklist. Jenkins revised and tweaked lyrics for the album through April 2003 - a month prior to the albums release - at which point he had settled on the final 14 song tracklist.

Themes and composition
Much of the music on the album was written while Jenkins was suffering through an extended period of depression in late 2000 and 2001. Jenkins noted in 2001 that he wished for the album to have more complex, layered compositions. He wanted to make a rock album, motivated to provide a counterpoint to Radiohead's Thom Yorke's then-recent assertion that rock was no longer interesting to him.

Promotion and release
By the time the album was completed and released, Elektra Records was in the midst of being absorbed into Atlantic Records, and Jenkins contends the group was not a priority: "Our record company ceased to exist the month the record was released," "Elektra Records imploded. It was just letterhead." The album cover is by photographer Mick Rock, and according to Jenkins screams "rock joy". The first 100,000 copies of the CD included a DVD documenting the making of the album.

Reception 

The album debuted at #12 on the Billboard 200 with 63,000 copies sold in its first week. By 2004, the album had sold 192,000 copies in the US.

While Out of the Vein has yet to be certified by the RIAA, the album had sold about 500,000 copies as of March 2007.

Track listing

Personnel 

Third Eye Blind
 Stephan Jenkins – lead vocals, rhythm guitar
 Arion Salazar – bass guitar, backing vocals
 Tony Fredianelli – lead guitar, backing vocals
 Brad Hargreaves – drums, percussion

Additional musicians
 Vanessa Carlton – piano on "Can't Get Away"
 Kimya Dawson – vocals on "Self Righteous"
 Kim Shattuck – backing vocals on "Faster"

Artwork
 Mick Rock – cover photo, photography
 Third Eye Blind – art direction

Production
 Stephan Jenkins and Arion Salazar – producers
 Tom Lord-Alge and Jason Carmer – mixing
 Sarah Register – assistant engineer
 Sylvia Rhone – A&R
 Emily Lazar – mastering
 Sean Beresford, Jason Carmer, Judy Kirschner, and Dann Michael Thompson – engineers

References

External links 

2003 albums
Third Eye Blind albums
Elektra Records albums
Albums with cover art by Mick Rock